Anne Carney is an American Democratic politician and attorney from Maine. She currently serves in the Maine Senate representing District 29, which consists of Cape Elizabeth, South Portland, and part of Scarborough. Carney was born in Baltimore, Maryland and attended Haverford College where she received a Bachelor of Arts (B.A.). She completed a Master of Theological Studies (M.T.S) from Harvard University in 1987 and moved to Maine in 1988. Carney completed a Juris Doctor at the University of Maine School of Law in 1990 and practiced employment, civil rights and municipal law for 16 years. She was a pro bono In-House Volunteer Attorney at Pine Tree Legal Assistance for eight years before running for Maine House of Representatives District 30 in 2018. In 2020, Carney was elected to her first term in the Maine Senate.

Early life, education & career
Carney was born in Baltimore, Maryland in 1963. She received a B.A. from Haverford College and then completed a Master of Theological Studies from Harvard University in 1987. Carney and her husband moved to Maine in 1988, and she graduated cum laude from the University of Maine School of Law in 1990.

Working at the law firm of Norman, Hanson, & DeTroy, Carney spent 16 years practicing employment, civil rights and municipal law. She became an In-House Volunteer Attorney at Pine Tree Legal Assistance and worked there for eight years before running for the Maine House in 2018.

Political career

Maine House
Carney credits an emotional conversation with her daughter as her inspiration to run for public office. In a 2018 interview, she explained that the morning after the 2016 United States presidential election, her daughter called her in tears, expressing dismay at Donald Trump's victory and uncertainty about whether to start a family under the circumstances. Carney explained that “I felt personally accountable when I realized the impact one individual over another had on my family.”

In the 2018 House District 30 Democratic primary, Carney defeated fellow Democrat Mary Ann Lynch 64-36%. In the general election, she defeated Republican Charles Rich 75%-25%. She served on the Labor and Housing Committee during her House term.

Maine Senate
Carney announced her candidacy for Maine Senate District 29 on November 2, 2019. She won a three-way Democratic primary, beating fellow Democrats Sari Greene and Eben Rose with 58% of the vote. In the general election, Carney faced Republican former Cumberland County District Attorney Stephanie Anderson and defeated her 67%-33%. Carney is the chair of the legislature's Judiciary Committee and serves on the Environment and Natural Resources committee.

Personal life
Carney and her husband David Wennberg have three adult children. They live in Cape Elizabeth. Carney is involved with several community organizations in Cape Elizabeth including the Two Lights Road Bicycle Path Committee, the Cape Elizabeth Land Trust, and the school system. She has been involved with the competitive swimming community in Maine and is a member of the Bicycle Coalition of Maine.

In her spare time, Carney enjoys cooking, canning, and being outdoors walking, biking, skiing, fishing and gardening.

Electoral record

Maine House

Maine Senate

References

External links
Anne for Maine on Instagram
Anne Carney State Senate official site
Maine Senate Democrats: Anne Carney
Senator Anne Carney on Facebook

Living people
Politicians from Baltimore
Haverford College alumni
Harvard Divinity School alumni
University of Maine School of Law alumni
Democratic Party Maine state senators
Women state legislators in Maine
21st-century American politicians
21st-century American women politicians
Maine lawyers
People from Cape Elizabeth, Maine
Democratic Party members of the Maine House of Representatives
Year of birth missing (living people)